Sisse Marie Holzmann Søby (born 21 November 1985) is a Danish actress, singer, model, TV hostess and songwriter.

Biography 
She was born in Aalborg. In 2001 she won the MGP Junior, which led to a gold certified album. The following year she received a Grammy for Best Teen Album. Since then, she worked as a model in Milan, London, Atlanta, Copenhagen, Oslo, Munich, Amsterdam, Istanbul and Stockholm. She has done model photos, catalogues and billboards for Tiffany Bridal, O'Neill, Heineken, Volvo, Citroën and Wonderbra. She has done photo series and covers of Cosmopolitan, T3, Ché and Marie Claire and runway for Italian Vogue.

In 2005 she released the single "Boom", which went in at No. 4 on the official Danish single chart. The following year she began as a hostess at the Danish MTV, and made the subsequent two seasons. Her program was MTV's most watched.

On 25 October 2010 she released the now gold certified single "Every Time (You Look at Me)". The song went straight to number 1 in Denmark and the music video was on the release day the 8th most watched on YouTube in the world. On 9 May 2011 she released the single "Dirty Hands" which went No. 1 on MTV Denmark and Brazil. 19 February she released the single "Kill for Your Love" which went No. 1 on MTV Denmark and on the national TV-channel DR MAMA.

On 15 November 2012 Sisse Marie had her song "Paralyzed" featured in life simulation video game The Sims 3. She was also designed as a digital character in the game. The game has sold more than 150 million copies worldwide.

In 2014, Sisse Marie moved to the United States after securing an American record deal, and shortly after, she was cast to star in several American feature films and television series.

In 2019, Sisse Marie was cast to star in the award-winning Freeform TV series Siren playing Yura, a feral mermaid and leader of the merpeople colony in Nome, Alaska.

Discography

Studio albums

Singles

See also 
 Nexus Music
 Morten Breum

References

External links
 

 Sisse Marie's official MySpace
 Sisse Marie's official Facebook
 Sisse Marie's official WiMP

Danish female models
21st-century Danish women singers
Living people
1985 births
People from Aalborg
English-language singers from Denmark
Danish women television presenters